Neal Hooker Williams (1870–1956) was a physicist notable for the very first spectroscopic measurements at microwave frequencies. He carried this out with a magnetron and investigated the spectrum of gaseous ammonia together with his student Claud E. Cleeton. This formed the groundwork for the later inventions of the radar and the gas laser.

Education

He completed his PhD in 1912 at the University of Michigan with a thesis entitled The Stability of Residual Magnetism.

Books by Williams
 Walter S. Huxford and Neal H. Williams, Determination of the Charge of Positive Thermions from Measurements of the Shot Effect, Minneapolis, Minn., 1929.
 Claud E. Cleeton and Neal H. Williams,  Electromagnetic Waves of 1.1 cm Wave-Length and the Absorption Spectrum of Ammonia, Lancaster, Pa., Lancaster press, inc., 1934.
 Harrison M. Randall, Neal H. Williams, and Walter F. Colby, General College Physics, New York, London, Harper & brothers, 1929.
 Neal H. Williams, The Stability of Residual Magnetism, New York, 1913.

See also 
 Trigonal pyramidal molecular geometry
 Ammonia
 Microwave spectroscopy
 Claud E. Cleeton

References

Sources
 Mario Bertolotti, The History of the Laser CRC Press, 2004, .

External links 
 Williams' 1936 Physical Review paper
 Williams in classbook of 1928
 Williams' math genealogy

1870 births
1956 deaths
University of Michigan alumni
American physicists